"The Crabfish" is a ribald humorous folk song of the English oral tradition. It dates back to the seventeenth century, appearing in Bishop Percy's Folio Manuscript as a song named "The Sea Crabb" based on an earlier tale. The moral of the story is that one should look in the chamber pot before using it.

Owing to the indelicate nature of its theme this ballad was intentionally excluded from Francis James Child's renowned compilation of folk songs The English and Scottish Popular Ballads. The song has a Roud Folk Song Index of 149. It is also known as "The Crayfish".

Synopsis

A man brings a crabfish (most likely a common lobster) home as a gift for his wife and puts it in the chamber pot. Some time in the night his wife answers a call of nature and the crustacean grabs her private parts. In the ensuing scuffle the husband gets bitten too.

Text

Variants
"Johnny Daddlum" is the Irish version of this song. There are variants in which the coarse language is more clear-cut than in others. In some variants the wife is pregnant, having previously told her husband about her craving to eat crabfish meat.

This song has also variants under other names such as "Old She-Crab," "The Crayfish," "A Combat Between an Ale-Wife and a Sea Crab," "The Fishy Crab," and "The Lobster."

Versions
A sanitised version of "The Crabfish," expunging the straightforwardness of the original in order to make the song available for child audiences, was released in recent years. Instead of private parts the crabfish grabs the wife by the "face" and "nose".

References

External links

Dan and Bonnie Milner sing "The Crabfish" at the 2009 Chicago Maritime Festival
Tom Chapin sings "The Crabfish Song" (children version)

English folk songs
Irish folk songs
Ethnic humour
Excretion
Year of song unknown
Songwriter unknown
Songs about invertebrates